Oakfield is a village in Genesee County, New York, United States. As of the 2010 census, the village population was 1,813. The village lies within the town of Oakfield in northern Genesee County. The village is at the intersection of Route 63 (Lewiston Road) and Route 262. It is northwest of Batavia.

History 

The community was  called "Caryville" and "Plain Brook" in the past. The village was incorporated in 1858, changing its name to "Oakfield" at that time.

Geography
NY Route 262 leads east  to Elba.

Demographics

As of the census of 2000, there were 1,805 people, 648 households, and 465 families residing in the village. The population density was 2,721.4 people per square mile (1,055.9/km2). There were 702 housing units at an average density of 1,058.4 per square mile (410.7/km2). The racial makeup of the village was 96.95% White, 1.22% Black or African American, 0.06% Native American, 0.22% Asian, 0.66% from other races, and 0.89% from two or more races. 0.94% of the population were Hispanic or Latino of any race.

There were 648 households, out of which 39.4% had children under the age of 18 living with them, 57.3% were married couples living together, 11.0% had a female householder with no husband present, and 28.2% were non-families. 22.1% of all households were made up of individuals, and 11.4% had someone living alone who was 65 years of age or older. The average household size was 2.77 and the average family size was 3.25.

In the village, the population was spread out, with 29.7% under the age of 18, 7.5% from 18 to 24, 30.4% from 25 to 44, 19.4% from 45 to 64, and 13.0% who were 65 years of age or older. The median age was 34 years. For every 100 females, there were 93.0 males. For every 100 females age 18 and over, there were 88.6 males.

The median income for a household in the village was $40,580, and the median income for a family was $45,270. Males had a median income of $32,981 versus $21,897 for females. The per capita income for the village was $15,962. 11.6% of the population and 8.0% of families were below the poverty line. Out of the total population, 15.8% of those under the age of 18 and 7.8% of those 65 and older were living below the poverty line.

Religion
Religious diversity is low, with all religious institutions adhering to Christianity. There are presently five churches in the village:
 Oakfield United Methodist Church
 Oakfield Community Bible Church
 St. Cecilia's Roman Catholic Church
 St. Michael's Episcopal Church
 Genesee Country Church

See also 
 Oakfield (town), New York

References

External links
 Village of Oakfield official website

Villages in New York (state)
Villages in Genesee County, New York